Jessica Rankin (born 1971, Sydney) is an Australian artist who lives and works in New York. She has participated in numerous group exhibitions in the US, Europe and Australia, including White Cube, London (2007), MoMA PS1, New York (2006) and Franklin Artworks, Minneapolis (2005). Rankin is best known for her organdy embroidery, although she also produces works in other mediums.

Personal life
Rankin's father is the artist David Rankin, and her mother is poet and playwright Jennifer Rankin. Her step-mother is author and poet Lily Brett. Rankin shares her studio with her partner, artist Julie Mehretu.

Work
Incorporating embroidery and needlework, Rankin's work and her organdy 'embroidered paintings' feature a series of 'mental maps' with codes, signs, and symbols that explore ideas of memory, intuition, and interpretation. Key embroidered works include Nocturne (2004), Hour to Hour (2007), Everything is Still There (2005) and Passage (Dusty Humming) (2007), which presented a new style of embroidered work focusing solely on text rather than text with image.

Rankin also creates drawings and watercolors that offer information on the process. Sketches of biomorphic forms are featured alongside abstract representations of astral or lunar cycles, while other studies depict recognizable scenery. Rankin's first European show at White Cube in 2007 highlighted this side of Rankin's practice by displaying 88 drawings and watercolors in their Hoxton Square gallery. Key works on paper include Cloud & Sun (2003), San Miguel (2005), Word Construction (2005), Leaves (2006), Rockface (2006) and Couple (2006).

Solo exhibitions
2007 	White Cube, London
2006 	The Measure of Every Pause, P.S. 1 Contemporary Arts Center, Long Island City, NY
2005 	Franklin Artworks, Minneapolis, MN
2004 	The Project, New York, NY
1999 	First Floor Gallery, Melbourne, Australia

References

Further reading
 Jessica Rankin/Sarah Kent, Jessica Rankin (London: Jay Jopling/White Cube, 2007)

External links
Jessica Rankin feature at StudioVisit.net
Jessica Rankin at White Cube gallery, London
Jessica Rankin at The Project gallery, New York
Jessica Rankin at Saatchi Gallery, London
Jessica Rankin at Highpoint Editions, Minneapolis
Jessica Rankin review from 2005 in Art In America
Rankin's page at Artnet.com
Rankin at Gigantic Art Space 

1971 births
Living people
Australian contemporary painters
Australian printmakers
Lesbian painters
American lesbian artists
Australian lesbian artists
American LGBT painters
Australian LGBT painters
Artists from New York (state)
Artists from Sydney
Australian expatriates in the United States
Australian women painters
Australian contemporary artists
20th-century American women artists
21st-century American women artists
20th-century printmakers
American women printmakers
20th-century Australian women artists
21st-century Australian women artists
Australian embroiderers